Night 'n' Gales is a 1937 Our Gang short comedy film directed by Gordon Douglas.  It was the 156th Our Gang short (157th episode, 68th talking short, and 69th talking episode that was released.

Plot
Though he would rather spend his evening in peace and quiet, Mr. Hood (Johnny Arthur) is forced to endure the offkey harmonizing of The Four Nightengales, a junior singing aggregation composed of Spanky, Alfalfa, Buckwheat and Porky.

After interminable choruses of "Home! Sweet Home!", the four boys are finally ready to leave, but are forced to stay in the Hood home due to a sudden thunderstorm. Both Darla and her mother are delighted, but Mr. Hood is dismayed, especially when he is told that he must share his bed with the Four Nightengales. Driven crazy by the boys' unintentionally disruptive shenanigans, Mr. Hood escapes to the living room and tries to sleep on the couch, covering himself with a bear rug to keep warm. Naturally, the gang mistake him for a real bear, and comic chaos ensues.

Notes
Comedian Johnny Arthur, who played Spanky McFarland's absent-minded father in Anniversary Trouble, returns as Darla's father in Night 'n' Gales. He was so popular with audiences that he played Darla's father once again in Feed 'em and Weep.

Cast

The Gang
 Darla Hood as Darla
 Eugene Lee as Porky
 George McFarland as Spanky
 Carl Switzer as Alfalfa
 Billie Thomas as Buckwheat
 Gary Jasgur as Junior

Additional cast
 Johnny Arthur as Arthur Hood, Darla's father
 Elaine Shepard as Darla's mother

See also
 Our Gang filmography

References

External links

1937 films
1937 comedy films
American black-and-white films
Films directed by Gordon Douglas
Hal Roach Studios short films
Our Gang films
1937 short films
1930s American films